Wallich is a surname. Notable people with the surname include:

 George Charles Wallich (1815–1899), a marine biologist and medical doctor; son of Nathaniel Wallich
 Henry Wallich (1914–1988), a banker and economist
 Hermann Wallich (1833–1928), a banker; father of Paul Wallich
 Nathaniel Wallich (1786–1854), a botanist and surgeon; father of George Charles Wallich
 Wallich's pheasant (a.k.a. cheer pheasant or Catreus wallichii), a bird species named after Nathaniel Wallich
 Paul Wallich (1882–1938), a banker; son of Hermann Wallich

See also
 Wallach (disambiguation)
 Wallachia (disambiguation)
 Oláh (disambiguation)
 Volokh, an alternate spelling (East Slavic)